Baragaon is a village in Jaunpur district, Uttar Pradesh state, India.

References

Villages in Jaunpur district